Time Stands Still is a 1982 Hungarian film about two brothers and the woman they both love, all living in Budapest during the uprising of 1956. It stars István Znamenák, Henrik Pauer, Sándor Sőth, Anikó Iván and Lajos Őze and was directed by Péter Gothár. Popular among audience and critics, it won the Award of the Youth at Cannes, the New York Film Critics Circle Award for Best Foreign Language Film and the award for Best Director at the Tokyo International Film Festival. The film was also selected as the Hungarian entry for the Best Foreign Language Film at the 55th Academy Awards, but was not accepted as a nominee. The film was chosen to be part of the New Budapest Twelve, a list of Hungarian films considered the best in 2000.

Cast
 Anikó Iván as Szukics Magda
 István Znamenák as Dini
 Péter Gálfy as Wilman Péter, "Vilma"
 Henrik Pauer as Gábor
 Sándor Sőth as Pierre
 Ágnes Kakassy as Anya
 Lajos Öze as Bodor
 Pál Hetényi as Apa

See also
 List of submissions to the 55th Academy Awards for Best Foreign Language Film
 List of Hungarian submissions for the Academy Award for Best Foreign Language Film

References

External links
 

1982 films
1982 drama films
1980s Hungarian-language films
Films directed by Péter Gothár
Hungarian drama films